eTV, previously known as DETV, was Malaysian IPTV based pay TV service owned by eTV Multimedia Sdn Bhd, a joint venture founded by REDtone International Bhd and Zhong Nan Enterprise (M) Bhd. It was officially launched on 26 January 2010. Many of its channels are sourced from mainland China.

As of 2011, the service was renamed eTV.

The service was closed on 29 February 2016.

Technology 
eTV is purely an IPTV-based service, it requires an internet connection to be able to receive its content. Currently the service uses decoders manufactured by Beijing Transvideo Digital Technology Co., Ltd.. The decoder is capable of connecting to the internet either wirelessly using Wi-Fi or over a wired ethernet connection. It offers component video, composite video and S-video output as well as two channel stereo sound output. Also present is a USB port which is currently unused.

Channels 
Currently eTV offers a wide range of television channels from mainland China such as CCTV channels, Hunan TV World, JSBC and many more. It also offers foreign language channels such as CCTV-E, Wion Tv, DW-TV and others.

Video on demand 
eTV also offers a comprehensive library of on-demand programming. Additionally, all aired programs are also stored on the company's servers and is freely accessible for up to 72 hours after it has aired, a standard function provided by most IPTV providers.

References

External links 
 

2010 establishments in Malaysia
2016 disestablishments in Malaysia
Streaming television
Television in Malaysia